Joey Konings (21 April 1998) is a Dutch professional footballer who plays as a striker for Eerste Divisie club FC Den Bosch.

Career

PSV
Having played for three clubs in his first three years of youth football, Konings joined the PSV academy from RKC Waalwijk in 2008. He made his professional debut as a Jong PSV player in the Eerste Divisie on 18 September 2015 against Sparta Rotterdam. He replaced Moussa Sanoh after 65 minutes.

Heracles Almelo
On 21 June 2018, he joined Heracles Almelo on a two-year contract. He made his Eredivisie debut on 2 December 2018 in Heracles' 4–1 win over VVV-Venlo. He scored his first goal for the club from close range in their 4–3 defeat to Willem II on 2 April 2019. He made 17 appearances in total across the 2018–19 Eredivisie. He scored once in 15 matches during the 2019–20 Eredivisie.

De Graafschap
On 13 May 2020, Konings signed a two-year contract with De Graafschap, with the option of an additional year. He made his debut for the club on 31 August, coming on as a 90th-minute substitute for Danny Verbeek in a 4–2 win over FC Den Bosch on the first matchday of the season. He finished his first season at the club with four goals in 34 total appearances, as he would mostly appear as a substitute. De Graafschap ended in third place in the league table, and faced eighth-placed Roda JC Kerkrade in the first round of play-offs for promotion. However, the match ended in disappointment as De Graafschap lost 2–3 at home, which meant that they would remain in the second division for the 2021–22 season. Konings came on in the 73rd minute of the game as a replacement for Clint Leemans, but could not prevent the defeat.

Konings finished the 2021–22 season with 8 goals in 33 appearances.

FC Den Bosch
On 23 June 2022, Konings signed for FC Den Bosch on a free transfer, signing a two-year contract.

International career
Konings is a youth international for the Netherlands.

Career statistics

References

External links
 

1998 births
Living people
Dutch footballers
Netherlands youth international footballers
Jong PSV players
Heracles Almelo players
De Graafschap players
FC Den Bosch players
Eredivisie players
Eerste Divisie players
Association football forwards
People from Landerd
Footballers from North Brabant